The Hamina Cadet School and Finland Cadet School were the common names for the Fredrikshamn cadet school during the period 1819–1901. The Cadet School was founded in 1780 by Georg Magnus Sprengtporten at Kuopio and transferred in 1781 to Rantasalmi where it was called Haapaniemi Cadet School. In 1819, after the School was transferred to Hamina (Swedish: Fredrikshamn) the name was changed accordingly, in common usage.

After Finnish independence in 1917 the Cadet school was moved to Santahamina in Helsinki.

In the 1920 the premises were occupied by the Reserve Officer School of the newly formed Finnish defence forces. Today the main building of the Cadet school hosts the headquarters of the Reserve Officer School of the Finnish Army.

Hamina Cadet School was abolished in 1903 with the abolition of the separate Army of the Grand duchy of Finland as part of the Russification policy. The conscription of Finnish soldiers directly to various units of the Russian Empire was seen as illegal and unconstitutional in Finland. Finnish officers protested first in through mass resignations and later through a strategy of disobedience, in what is now known as the conscription strikes. Finally it was settled that the Grand Duchy of Finland would fulfil its obligation to the common defence with a monetary compensation to the Russian Empire instead through the provision of conscripts.

Significance

Many of the officers from the Fredrikshamn Cadet school played an important part in the early independence movement of Finland; both in the administration of the Grand Duchy as well as in active support of the resistance.

In 1917 when the Russian Empire broke apart and Finland gained its independence, as the highest ranking Finnish officer at the time, Mannerheim was called by the Senate to organise the Civil Guard into a new Finnish army. Until early 1917 Mannerheim was a general in the Imperial Russian Army commanding Russian cavalry troops in the southern front. After the abdication of the Tsar Nicholas II in March, he returned to Finland.

Some other former Hamina cadets such as Carl Enckell, Rudolf Walden, and Hannes Ignatius would rise to the occasion, but their effect was due to individual abilities. Most reliable Finnish officers from Hamina were too old and retired from active duty to form an effective core for the new Finnish army.

The field command of the new army had to be formed from the members in the Finnish Jäger troops. These were men who had travelled as individuals to Germany 1915-1917 to receive training in the German army in order to liberate Finland. Jäger troops had fought against the Russian empire. Those Finnish officers who had continued to serve in the Russian army were seen unpatriotic and considered unreliable by the Jäger.

Therefore, at first there was a certain degree of distrust between Mannerheim's headquarters and the younger, mainly Finnish speaking, generation of Jäger officers. However the differences never surfaced during the war of 1918. After the Whites' victory in that war, Mannerheim resigned as Commander-in-Chief, dismayed at the increasing German influence in Finnish military and political affairs.

After the fall of the German Empire later in 1918 the background of individual officers lost its political significance. Mannerheim was called in to be the Regent of Finland. Army of Finland and the Civil Guard were organised by Mannerheim and Walden as the Minister of Defence. However jäger officers continued to form the basis of the officer core.

Notable Hamina cadets

 Field Marshal Mannerheim was a cadet at Hamina cadet school. Due to a disciplinary breach he was expelled in his final year in 1886, which caused him to continue his military career in the Imperial Russian Army.
 Alexander Järnefelt was a Finnish topographical officer who made a topographic survey of large swathes of Bulgaria in the late 1870s. In the 1880s, he served as a governor in several Finnish provinces, advancing the programme of the Fennoman movement forcefully, ending his career as a senator of the Senate of Finland
 Carl Enckell, a politician, officer and a diplomat, graduated as an officer from Hamina Cadet School after which he served in the Imperial Russian Army learning fluent Russian. In 1917 Enckell negotiated for Finnish independence in Saint Petersburg in the position of Finnish Minister Secretary of State and representative of Senate of Finland. Later he served Finland on several occasions as the minister of foreign affairs and as the Finnish delegate to the League of Nations.
 General Rudolf Walden received his military education at Hamina Cadet School 1892-1900. He was the best of his class. Walden  was dismissed from service in 1902, in connection with a conscription strike. After leaving the army Walden had a notable career in business.
 General Hannes Ignatius received his military education at Hamina Cadet School 1885-1892, and in the Nicholas General Staff Academy in St Petersburg 1896-1899. Served in the Finnish Dragoon Regiment 1892-1901 after which he was a businessman.
 Vilhelm Aleksander Thesleff received his military education at Hamina Cadet School from 1894–1901, and in the Nicholas Academy of General Staff in St.Petersburg 1904-1907, and the Officers Cavalry School 1910-1911. He was a Finnish general, first Minister of Defence of Finland and briefly the commander in chief of the Finnish army in 1918.
 Waldemar Becker graduated from the Hamina Cadet School in 1858, served in the Finnish Guard and then in the Nicholas General Staff Academy. Deserted Russian army in 1862 after which he served with several different regimes and armies on four continents, including France, Spain, Mexico, Egypt and Serbia.

References

Further reading  
 
 

Military history of Finland
Hamina